The men's 60 metres hurdles event  at the 1973 European Athletics Indoor Championships was held on 11 March in Rotterdam.

Medalists

Results

Heats
First 3 from each heat (Q) qualified directly for the semifinals.

Semifinals
First 3 from each heat (Q) qualified directly for the final.

Final

References

60 metres hurdles at the European Athletics Indoor Championships
60